Erika Leal-Ramirez (born 11 July 1977) in Mexico City) is a synchronised swimmer who represented Mexico at the 1996 and 2000 Olympic Games and has been selected to represent Australia at the 2008 Games.

Leal-Ramirez, who is an electrical engineer, moved to Australia in 2003 to do a master's degree at RMIT. This in turn led to permanent residency and a job. She took Australian citizenship in 2007 and became eligible for selection on the Australian team in Beijing. She will compete in the duet with Myriam Glez, who also previously competed at the Olympics for another country, France.

References
 Australian Olympic Committee profile

1977 births
Living people
Synchronized swimmers at the 1996 Summer Olympics
Synchronized swimmers at the 2000 Summer Olympics
Synchronized swimmers at the 2008 Summer Olympics
Olympic synchronized swimmers of Mexico
Olympic synchronised swimmers of Australia
Australian electrical engineers
Australian female swimmers